Neuves-Maisons (literally New Houses) is a commune in the Meurthe-et-Moselle department in north-eastern France, on the banks of the Moselle.

The city had a great steel industry during the 19th and 20th century.

Neuves-Maisons erected a plaque in the memory of Émilie Busquant, a feminist, anarcho-syndicalist and anti-colonial activist born in the area, on the fiftieth anniversary of her death in 2003. A 2015 documentary by director Rabah Zanoun introduced a French audience to her forgotten story.

Population

See also
 Communes of the Meurthe-et-Moselle department

References

External links 

 

Communes of Meurthe-et-Moselle